Plassay is a commune in the Charente-Maritime department in southwestern France.

Population

See also
 Communes of the Charente-Maritime department

References

External links
 

Communes of Charente-Maritime